Aristotelia decoratella is a moth of the family Gelechiidae. It is found in Portugal, France, Italy, Switzerland, Germany, Hungary, Slovakia, Bulgaria, Russia, as well as on Sardinia, Corsica and Sicily. It is also present in Asia Minor.

References

Moths described in 1879
Aristotelia (moth)
Moths of Europe
Moths of Asia